Sartakhti-ye Shahabad (also Romanized as Sartakhtī-ye Shāhābād; also known as Sartakhtī) is a village in Bampur-e Gharbi Rural District, in the Central District of Bampur County, Sistan and Baluchestan Province, Iran. At the 2006 census, its population was 598, in 118 families.

References 

Populated places in Bampur County